The Torch is a science fiction novel by author Jack Bechdolt. It was first published in book form in 1948 by Prime Press in an edition of 3,000 copies.  The novel was originally serialized in the magazine Argosy in January 1920.

Plot introduction
The novel is set in the year 3010, in the ruins of New York after a comet has devastated the Earth.  Fortune is the captain of the army of the Towermen, those who live in the remaining skyscrapers and rule the city with an iron hand.  He is taken captive by the people of the Island of the Statue.  There, Fortune learns of a prophecy that states that the people will be free when the torch burns in the hands of the statue.  Fortune is redeemed by his captors and leads them in a revolt against his former masters.

References

External links
 
 

1948 American novels
American science fiction novels
Novels first published in serial form
Works originally published in Argosy (magazine)
Novels set in New York City